Guest iin London  is an Indian Hindi comedy film, written and directed by Ashwni Dhir.  It stars Kartik Aaryan, Kriti Kharbanda, Paresh Rawal and Tanvi Azmi. Produced by Panorama Studios and co-produced by Nishant Pitti. It was released worldwide on 7 July 2017, to negative reviews from critics.

Plot
The film revolves around Aryan Shergill (Kartik Aaryan) and his girlfriend Anaya Patel (Kriti Kharbanda) life, which takes a turn when uninvited guests visit them in London.

Aryan Shergill is a migrant worker  in the UK, but his working visa expires. He resolves to arrange a sham marriage in order to obtain indefinite leave to remain, and ultimately British citizenship. He chooses Anaya (a taxi driver), promising to give her £7,000 in return. They conspire to have a fake marriage by lying to the court. Aryan takes Anaya to his home to make the court believe them. A few days later, Gangasharan and Guddi (Chacha and Chachi ji) visit them, telling them that they are Aryan's relatives. He takes them home, and makes Anaya somehow accept them for a few days. Chacha and Chachi ji get Aryan and Anaya married. On their marriage night Aryan gets drunk and confesses his love to Anaya. Some days later Anaya also tells him that she loves him and things start smoothening somewhat.

Aryan then introduces Chacha ji to his boss. When Chacha ji subsequently visits Aryan's office, he accidentally turns on the filter, which is out of order, making the boss have a current shock. The next day, Aryan-Anaya and the guests are invited to his office party, where Chacha ji notices Aryan's boss harassing his secretary, and stops him, bywhich Aryan loses his job. Shortly thereafter the couple starts getting irritated by the visit of Chacha and Chachi and try multiple methods to send them away. One day Aryan and Anaya spot something mysterious about them, seeing them lying about their whereabouts, and visiting some other place and other person. They check their luggage and find old newspapers detailing the 9/11 attacks, which makes the two suspicious. So Aryan, one day takes them to a cafe and leaves them there, and returns home. By then, Anaya gets a courier from neighbours and they open to find that Chacha and Chachi ji came to collect their son's belongings. The couple visit their son's boss and they learn that he died in the 9/11 World Trade Center attack and 100000 pounds given in insurance was transferred by Chacha ji to Aryan's bank account. The couple feels guilty and starts searching for them. Finally, they meet them in New York and they apologise to each other.
 
A few months later Chacha and Chachi ji visits them again, when Anaya is pregnant making the couple feel uncomfortable again.

Cast
Kartik Aaryan as Aryan Shergill
Kriti Kharbanda as Anaya Patel Shergill
Paresh Rawal as Gangasharan Gandotra/Chachaji
Ajay Devgn as Ajay Gandotra (Special Appearance)
Sanjay Mishra as Habibi/Qureshi
Tanvi Azmi as Guddi/Shazia Khan Gandotra
Sharad Kelkar as CODE Company Owner, Ajay's friend (Special Appearance)
Mohit Chhabra as Jassi
Shafaq Naaz as Sherry, Anaya's friend
Lucinda Nicholas as Terry, Anaya's friend
Naveen Kaushik as Kit/Kaalia, Aryan's boss
Vishwa S. Badola as Mr. Mehta 
Diljohn Singh as Manish Mehta, Mr. Mehta's grandson
 Nidhi Mathur as Pony Singh, neighbour

Production

Development
The film was officially announced in July 2016. The title of the film was said to be Atithii iin London.

Casting
The makers of the film initially finalized Lisa Haydon to cast in the film, though eventually Kirti Kharbanda was finalized for the role of Kartik's wife. Paresh Rawal and Tanvi Azmi have been confirmed to play as lead roles in the film. Shafaq Naaz, who played Kunti in Star Plus Mahabharat, will also be seen in this movie she will be seen as one of the friends of Kriti Kharbanda.

Filming
Principal photography of the film commenced on 1 October 2016. Film was shot in London and Birmingham, England also New York City, United States.

Soundtrack

The music is composed by Raghav Sachar and Amit Mishra while the lyrics have been penned by Kumaar, T.S. Jarnail, Navendu Tripathi, Amit Mishra and Saint Shah Hussain. The first song of the film Frankly Tu Sona Nachdi sung by Raghav Sachar and Tarannum Malik was released on 18 May 2017. The second song of the film titled as Dil Mera sung by Ash King, Prakriti Kakar and Shahid Mallya was released on 25 May 2017. The third single to be released was Daru Vich Pyaar which is a recreated version of the song itself from the 2001 film Tum Bin and sung by Taz and Arya Acharya was released on 30 May 2017. The soundtrack was released by T-Series on 2 June 2017 which includes 5 songs.

References

External links
 

2017 films
2017 romantic comedy films
2010s Hindi-language films
Films set in London
Indian romantic comedy films